Emmanuel Baptist College is a government approved secondary school located at Tanke in Ilorin, Kwara State, Nigeria. It is a mixed private mission school.

History  
Emmanuel Baptist College, Ilorin was established by Emmanuel Baptist Church, Ilorin on October 9, 2000. 
Emmanuel Baptist College is a registered member of the Nigerian Baptist Convention of Private Schools. It participates in the yearly organized Baptist Mission Schools Seminars and workshops. It is run by a committee from the church. A principal is appointed by the committee to manage the affairs of the school.

Emmanuel Baptist College is an approved NECO SSCE and WASSCE centre.

Sport 
Emmanuel Baptist College holds its interhouse sport competition annually or bi-annually. The sports in the competition are football, march past, table tennis, long and short-distance races and marathon race.

Departments 
Emmanuel Baptist College has Science, Art and Commercial departments for the senior secondary students while the junior secondary students all do the same subjects.

References

Ilorin
Secondary schools in Kwara State
Educational institutions established in 2000
2000 establishments in Nigeria
Baptist schools in Nigeria